Airplay was a short-lived American band, formed by David Foster and Jay Graydon. The band released a self-titled album in 1980, containing "Nothin' You Can Do About It" (originally recorded by The Manhattan Transfer) and the original recording of the Earth, Wind & Fire hit "After the Love Has Gone", written by Foster and Graydon with Bill Champlin.

Graydon was asked about Airplay in a 2014 interview:

Personnel

Principal members
 Jay Graydon – vocals, guitar
 David Foster – keyboards, background vocals
 Tommy Funderburk – vocals

Backing musicians
 Toto members
 Jeff Porcaro – drums
 David Hungate – bass
 Steve Lukather – additional rhythm guitars
 Steve Porcaro – synthesizer programming
 Others
 Warren Wiebe
 Mike Baird – drums
 Ray Parker Jr. – additional rhythm guitars
 Pete Robinson – synthesizer programming
 Jerry Hey – trumpet & flugelhorn
 Gary Grant – trumpet
 Steve Madaio – trumpet
 Bill Reichenbach Jr. – trombone
 Charlie Loper – trombone
 Lew McCreary – trombone
 Background vocals
 Bill Champlin
 Tom Kelly
 Max Gronenthal

Discography

Studio albums
 Airplay (1980)

Singles
"Stranded" (1980)
"Nothin' You Can Do About It" (1980)
"Should We Carry On" (1981)
"Stressed Out (Close to the Edge)" in St. Elmo's Fire soundtrack (1985)

References

External links
 Airplay MySpace page

American rock music groups
Musical groups established in 1980
Musical groups disestablished in 1980
RCA Records artists